Mick Deegan (born 1964) is a former manager of the Dublin junior Gaelic football team and Fingal Ravens. He is a former inter-county Gaelic footballer for Dublin, and a former footballer for Crusaders.

Playing career
Mick won his first inter-county medal for Dublin in 1982 when Dublin won the All-Ireland Minor Football Championship. He went on to make his debut for the Dublin senior football team in a National Football League game against Longford in 1985. In his 1991 all star year, he was on the victorious National football league Dublin team that defeated Kildare. He won his second NFL medal with Dublin in 1993, in a hard-fought final against Donegal. The game was brought to a replay which Dublin eventually won to win their 8th title.

He also won the All-Ireland senior football championship with Dublin in 1995. The game which finished on a scoreline of 1–10 to 0–12, was against Tyrone.

In the Dublin Senior Football Championship, Deegan had a successful club career with Erin's Isle. He appeared in his first Dublin championship in 1982, the same year in which he won an all-Ireland minor medal. Ballymun Kickhams went on to win the 1982 Dublin championship. He eventually won his first Dublin championship with Erins Isle in 1993 by beating Kilmacud Crokes in the final. The three years were to bring heartbreak, with three losses in the final, three years in a row. The finals were lost to Kilmacud Crokes in 1994, Ballyboden St Endas in 1995 and St. Sylvester's, Malahide in 1996. He won his final championship with Erins Isle in 1997. After the 1997 win, Erins Isle went on to win the 1997 Leinster Senior Club Football Championship.

Deegan also had spells playing soccer for Tolka Rovers, and for Northern Irish club Crusaders, with whom he won the Irish Premier League title in 1995 and 1997.

He is a garage proprietor by trade.

Managerial career
He is the current manager of Fingal Ravens and guided them to their first ever Dublin Intermediate Football Championship in 2007. This means that Ravens will play in the Dublin Senior Football Championship in 2008. He won the Leinster Intermediate Club Football Championship title as manager of Fingal Ravens on 9 December 2007. Deegan also manages the Dublin county junior football team, which won the All Ireland Junior Title in 2008.

He has been a selector for the Dublin senior football team under Jim Gavin.

References

External links
1992 Article on Mick Deegan

1964 births
Living people
Dublin inter-county Gaelic footballers
Erins Isle Gaelic footballers
Gaelic football backs
Gaelic footballers who switched code
Gaelic football managers
Gaelic football selectors
Winners of one All-Ireland medal (Gaelic football)
Crusaders F.C. players
NIFL Premiership players
Tolka Rovers F.C. players
Association footballers not categorized by position
Republic of Ireland association footballers